Daniel Pettersson (born July 19, 1969) is a retired ice hockey player who spent 14 seasons with Skellefteå AIK and played 56 Elitserien games with them. His son, Marcus Pettersson, currently plays with the Pittsburgh Penguins of the NHL.

References

External links

1969 births
Living people
Place of birth missing (living people)
Swedish ice hockey centres
Skellefteå AIK players